556 is the year 556 AD.

556 may also refer to:
 556 (number)
 556 BC
 
 5.56mm or 5.56×45mm NATO, a common rifle cartridge
 Sig 556, a commercial variant of the Sig SG 551 rifle designed for the American civilian market
 5-56, a popular brand of penetrating oil
 556 dual timer, an integrated circuit
 556, a fictional character in the Sgt. Frog series